The men's 125 kg freestyle wrestling competition at the 2018 Commonwealth Games in Gold Coast, Australia was held on 14 April at the Carrara Sports and Leisure Centre.

Results
Legend
F — Won by fall
R — Retired
WO — Won by walkover

References

External links
 https://www.livemint.com/Sports/DdC196KADJERRUjr5hGnsK/2018-Commonwealth-Games-Wrestler-Sumit-Malik-claims-125kg-g.html

Wrestling at the 2018 Commonwealth Games